Vidy is an area of the city of Lausanne (Switzerland), on the shores of Lake Geneva.

Since 1968, the headquarters of the International Olympic Committee have been at Vidy. The Olympic Museum and the Olympic Park (sculpture garden) are at Ouchy, to the east of Vidy.

Gallery

Notes and references

See also 
 International Olympic Committee
 Stade Pierre de Coubertin

External links 

  Page on the website of the City of Lausanne
  Parc Louis-Bourget
  Lausanne-Vidy Roman Museum

Lausanne
Parks in Lausanne